Endothiodontia is a clade of dicynodont therapsids that includes the family Endothiodontidae and possibly the family Eumantellidae.

References

Dicynodonts
Lopingian first appearances
Lopingian extinctions